Annabella Jäger (born 16 July 1998) is a German badminton player. Jäger who affiliate with TSV 1906 Freystadt won the 2016 Southeast German badminton championships in the women's singles event, also clinched three title in the junior by winning the girls' singles, girls' doubles and mixed doubles.

Achievements

BWF International Challenge/Series (1 title, 2 runners-up) 
Women's doubles

  BWF International Challenge tournament
  BWF International Series tournament
  BWF Future Series tournament

References

External links 
 

1998 births
Living people
Sportspeople from Saxony
German female badminton players